The 2007 Karjala Tournament took place from November 8-11, 2007. Five games were played in Finland and one was played in Sweden. Russia won the tournament before Sweden and the Czech Republic. The tournament was part of the 2007-08 Euro Hockey Tour.

Sweden opened the tournament in Jönköping, losing 1-3 against Russia.

Final standings

Results 
All times local (UTC+2)

Best players 
The tournament directorate named the following players in the tournament 2007:

 Best goalkeeper:  Jussi Markkanen
 Best defenceman:  Kenny Jönsson
 Best forward:  Oleg Saprykin

References

External links 
Tournament on hockeyarchives.info

2007–08 Euro Hockey Tour
2007–08 in Swedish ice hockey
2007–08 in Russian ice hockey
2007–08 in Finnish ice hockey
2007–08 in Czech ice hockey
Karjala Tournament
2007
November 2007 sports events in Europe
2000s in Helsinki
Sports competitions in Jönköping